Caloptilia porphyretica (blueberry leafminer) is a moth of the family Gracillariidae. It is known from North Carolina and New Jersey in the United States.

It is a frequent pest in commercial highbush blueberries in New Jersey. There are at least three generations per year.

The larvae feed on Rhododendron species, including Rhododendron occidentale. They mine the leaves of their host plant. The mine has the form of a tentiform mine on the underside of the leaf. The lower epidermis is wrinkled. Later, the leaf is rolled from the tip downward onto the underside of the leaf.

References

External links
Seasonal Abundance, Life History, and Parasitism of Caloptilia porphyretica (Lepidoptera: Gracillariidae), a Leafminer of Highbush Blueberry

porphyretica
Moths of North America
Moths described in 1923